Masjid Ahmad (Jawi:مسجد أحمد; Malay for, Ahmad Mosque is a mosque in Singapore located in the Pasir Panjang area, at the junction of South Buona Vista Road and Lorong Sarhad. It was originally a kampung mosque built in 1934, but has been later redeveloped.

Transportation
The mosque is accessible from Pasir Panjang MRT station.

See also
Islam in Singapore
List of mosques in Singapore

External links 
Ahmad Mosque
Majlis Ugama Islam Singapura, MUIS (Islamic Religious Council of Singapore)
List of Mosques in Singapore managed by MUIS : Masjid Ahmad
GoogleMaps StreetView of Masjid Ahmad

1934 establishments in Singapore
Mosques completed in 1934
Ahmad
20th-century architecture in Singapore